alpha Kappa Delta Phi, also known as aKDPhi, Kappa Delta Phi, KDPhi, is an international Asian-interest sorority founded at the University of California, Berkeley. alpha Kappa Delta Phi has 63 chapters located at numerous universities across the United States and in Canada. It is part of the National APIDA Panhellenic Association (NAPA), which it helped charter in 2006.

History
alpha Kappa Delta Phi was established at the University of California in the Fall of 1989 and recognized by the College Panhellenic Association on February 7, 1990. There were fourteen founding sisters: 

The Founders dedicated themselves "to establishing a sorority which would offer Asian American women the opportunity to participate in the Greek system while also establishing an organization which would last as a strong tradition."

During the fall of 2002, the National Alumnae Board was established under the guidance of the National Board Alumnae Chair, Sophia Yen, to oversee the expansion and growth of the sorority’s alumnae. The 2002-2003 National Alumnae Board strongly desired a working organization that would provide programs and services to all alumnae. This idea later blossomed into the formation of the National Alumnae Association. With a true grassroots beginning, the National Alumnae Board’s initial activity focused on creating a mentoring program that would drive rich learning and development for both mentees and mentors. The success of the mentorship initiative led to the addition of a scholarship program that would award financial aid to sisters looking to further their education. Over the years, the National Alumnae Board has proudly sponsored many programs to edify our alumnae in helping them pursue their dreams, passions, and legacies. To date, the National Alumnae Association is still holding fast to its purpose: to continue the sisterhood after graduation.  As such, it remains the leading avenue for our alumnae to connect with one another and express their timeless affection and everlasting devotion to alpha Kappa Delta Phi.

Asian Awareness
alpha Kappa Delta Phi promotes Asian Awareness, one of its founding principles, by encouraging its members to be constantly aware of and involved in Asian American issues in their communities. Chapters host events such as forums, presentations, and workshops. Many of these events take place during May, which is Asian Pacific American Heritage Month.

Philanthropy
alpha Kappa Delta Phi's national philanthropy is breast cancer awareness.

alpha Kappa Delta Phi's breast cancer awareness campaign began in 1998, and its exclusive partnership with Avon began in 2010 and ended in 2017. Across all chapters, the sorority hosts various events to raise awareness and fundraise towards this initiative, including but not limited to breast cancer awareness banquets, information sessions, workshops, and discussion groups. In 2016, the sorority raised and donated over $102,000, hitting the half a million mark in terms of the total dollar amount donated to the Avon Breast Cancer Crusade since the start of their partnership in 2010.

The aKDPhi Foundation
The aKDPhi Foundation, also known as The Foundation, was chartered in 2011 by the alpha Kappa Delta Phi Board of Directors and initiated by then Board of Directors Chairman, Aprileen Coh, with a focus on supporting educational, leadership, and philanthropic development. The Foundation was formally recognized in 2013 as a 501(c)(3) public charity by the Internal Revenue Service and is considered a separate entity from alpha Kappa Delta Phi International Sorority, Inc.

Today, the Foundation has expanded its mission to focus on women empowerment, and does so through fundraising efforts, grant programs, programming and scholarship initiatives. Its ultimate vision is a world where women of ALL backgrounds have equal access to personal & professional development and physical & mental health resources.

Public symbolism 
 alpha Kappa Delta Phi uses four Greek letters in its name, and chooses not to capitalize the first letter, or Alpha.  Thus, in Greek, its letters are written: αΚΔΦ. 
 The sorority's official symbol is the Hourglass.  Additionally, a candle features prominently on its crest.
 Its colors are Compassion Purple and White.
 The official stone is the Diamond.
 The official flower is the Iris.
 The mascot is the Phoenix.

Chapters
The following are the chapters of alpha Kappa Delta Phi. "Full-Fledged Chapters" have met all the requirements for the sorority's "Chapter Advancement Process"; associate chapters meet some of the requirements toward installation, but are still developing toward "Full-Fledged Chapter" status. These and αΚΔΦ's active pre-associate chapters are all listed in bold, inactive groups are listed in italics.

Full-Fledged Chapters
 University of California, Davis
 University of California, Santa Cruz
 Stanford University
 University of Texas at Austin
 University of Pennsylvania
 University of Houston
 University of Michigan, Ann Arbor
 Pennsylvania State University 
 San Jose State University
 California Polytechnic State University, San Luis Obispo 
 University of Washington 
 State University of New York at Buffalo
 University of Virginia
T Cornell University
Y University of Illinois at Urbana-Champaign
 University of Oklahoma
 Rutgers University
AA University of South Florida
AB Duke University
 State University of New York at Stony Brook
 University of Florida
AE University of Wisconsin-Madison

Associate Chapters
Boston University
Johns Hopkins University
Baylor University
University of Illinois at Chicago
University of North Carolina at Chapel Hill
State University of New York at Binghamton
Virginia Commonwealth University
Virginia Polytechnic Institute and State University
James Madison University
Florida State University
University of Chicago
University of Maryland, College Park
New York University
University of California, Irvine
California State University, Sacramento
University of Iowa
Purdue University at West Lafayette
University of Texas at Arlington

Pre-Associate Chapters
Carnegie Mellon University
University of Maryland, Baltimore County
University of Toronto
St. John's University
California State University San Marcos
George Mason University
San Francisco State University
Northern Illinois University
University of North Florida
Syracuse University
Wilfrid Laurier University
University of Texas at Dallas
University of Central Florida
University of Georgia
University of Kansas
Rochester Institute of Technology
University of Massachusetts Amherst
University of Georgia
Oklahoma State University
Indiana University Bloomington

Inactive Chapters
University of California, Berkeley
University of California, Riverside
 University of California, Santa Barbara
 Northeastern University
University of California, San Diego
Michigan State University

Dormant Chapters 
The City University of New York, Baruch College

See also
List of social fraternities and sororities

References

External links
alpha Kappa Delta Phi Sorority, Inc. National Website
alpha Kappa Delta Phi Sorority, Inc. National Alumnae Website

Asian-American culture in California
Asian-American fraternities and sororities
Student organizations established in 1990
Student societies in the United States
1990 establishments in California